Marquis Devante Teague (born February 28, 1993) is an American professional basketball player for Kolossos Rodou of the Greek Basket League. He was one of the top-rated high school basketball players in the class of 2011.

High school career
In July 2010, Teague, along with future Kentucky teammate Michael Kidd-Gilchrist, were a part of the gold medal-winning team in the FIBA U-17 World Championships in Hamburg, Germany.

Considered a five-star recruit by Rivals.com, Teague was listed as the No. 1 point guard and the No. 5 player in the nation in 2011. He was a part of the Indiana versus Kentucky All-stars game.

College career
Teague committed to Kentucky on April 22, 2010.

In the first game of the 2011–12 season and his career as a Wildcat, Teague started and scored 16 points on 7 of 12 shooting. One of Teague's best performances of the season came against the Portland Pilots, a game where he scored 14 points, had a career high of eight assists, and a career high of 4 steals, all while committing no turnovers and shooting 5 of 6 from the free throw line. Against the Louisville Cardinals, Teague scored just 4 points on 1 of 8 shooting, but did dish out 5 assists and played good defense on Louisville point guard Peyton Siva, who shot 2 of 13 from the field. Teague helped Kentucky win their 8th national championship.

College statistics

|-
| style="text-align:left;"| 2011–12
| style="text-align:left;"| Kentucky
| 40 || 40 || 32.6 || .415 || .325 || .714 || 2.5 || 4.9 || 0.9 || 0.2 || 10.0
|-
| style="text-align:left;"| Career
| style="text-align:left;"|
| 40 || 40 || 32.6 || .415 || .325 || .714 || 2.5 || 4.9 || 0.9 || 0.2 || 10.0

Professional career
In April 2012, Teague declared for the 2012 NBA draft. He was selected by the Chicago Bulls with the 29th overall pick.

On December 3, 2013, Teague was assigned to the Iowa Energy; he was recalled the next day. On December 26, 2013, he was reassigned to the Energy. On January 15, 2014, he was recalled.

On January 21, 2014, Teague was traded to the Brooklyn Nets in exchange for Tornike Shengelia.

On October 24, 2014, Teague was traded, along with a 2019 second-round pick, to the Philadelphia 76ers in exchange for Casper Ware. Three days later, he was waived by the 76ers. On November 1, 2014, he was selected by the Oklahoma City Blue with the ninth overall pick in the 2014 NBA Development League draft.

On November 3, 2015, Teague was reacquired by the Blue. Teague played for the OKC Blue of the NBDL in the 2015–16 season. He averaged 15.2 points a game, 30.8 minutes a game, 5.7 field goals made, 14.2 for the field goals attempted, .726% free throw percentage, 0.9 threes a game, 2.5 threes attempted, 34% three point percentage, 3 fts made, 0.4 off rebounds, 2.5 rebounds, 5.7 assists, 0.8 in steals a game, 0.3 blocks, 3 turnovers a game.

On July 17, 2016, Teague signed with Ironi Nahariya of the Israeli League. On October 31, he was waived by Nahariya and on November 26, he signed in Russia with Avtodor Saratov of the VTB United League. On March 2, 2017, Teague was acquired by the Fort Wayne Mad Ants of the NBA Development League.

On August 23, 2017, Teague was selected by the Memphis Hustle in the NBA G League expansion draft.

On August 30, 2018, Teague signed with Jeonju KCC Egis of the Korean league. He joined the Memphis Hustle in 2019. Teague averaged 13.2 points and 4.3 assists per game in 2019–20 season.

Teague spent the 2021-2022 season with the British club London Lions, averaging 14.7 points, 2.4 rebounds, 4.6 assists and 1.2 steals in 13 games. On September 28, 2022, Teague signed with Greek club Kolossos Rodou.

NBA career statistics

Regular season

|-
| style="text-align:left;"| 
| style="text-align:left;"| Chicago
| 48 || 0 || 8.2 || .381 || .174 || .563 || 0.9 || 1.3 || 0.2 || 0.1 || 2.1
|-
| style="text-align:left;"| 
| style="text-align:left;"| Chicago
| 19 || 2 || 12.7 || .242 || .200 || .688 || 1.0 || 1.5 || 0.1 || 0.2 || 2.4
|-
| style="text-align:left;"| 
| style="text-align:left;"| Brooklyn
| 21 || 1 || 9.6 || .415 || .375 || .789 || 1.0 || 1.4 || 0.4 || 0.0 || 3.0
|-
| style="text-align:left;"| 
| style="text-align:left;"| Memphis
| 3 || 0 || 24.7 || .250 || .250 || .400 || 2.0 || 4.3 || 1.3 || 0.0 || 3.7
|-
| style="text-align:left;"| Career
| style="text-align:left;"|
| 91 || 3 || 10.0 || .343 || .222 || .661 || 1.0 || 1.5 || 0.3 || 0.1 || 2.4

Playoffs

|-
| style="text-align:left;"| 2013
| style="text-align:left;"| Chicago
| 8 || 0 || 9.0 || .294 || .000 || .000 || 0.4 || 1.5 || 0.3 || 0.1 || 1.3
|-
| style="text-align:left;"| Career
| style="text-align:left;"|
| 8 || 0 || 9.0 || .294 || .000 || .000 || 0.4 || 1.5 || 0.3 || 0.1 || 1.3

Personal life
Teague is the son of Shawn and Carol Teague. He has four siblings, including one time NBA all-star Jeff Teague.  Shawn played for Norm Stewart at the University of Missouri before transferring to Boston University, where he finished his career playing for Rick Pitino; he, like both sons, was an Indiana All-Star following his senior season of high school basketball.

See also

References

External links
 
 Kentucky Wildcats bio
 NBADraft.net Profile
 Scout.com Profile
 Rivals.com Profile
 

1993 births
Living people
21st-century African-American sportspeople
African-American basketball players
American expatriate basketball people in Greece
American expatriate basketball people in Israel
American expatriate basketball people in Russia
American expatriate basketball people in South Korea
American expatriate basketball people in the United Kingdom
American men's basketball players
Basketball players from Indianapolis
BC Avtodor Saratov players
Brooklyn Nets players
Chicago Bulls draft picks
Chicago Bulls players
Fort Wayne Mad Ants players
Iowa Energy players
Ironi Nahariya players
Jeonju KCC Egis players
Kentucky Wildcats men's basketball players
Kolossos Rodou B.C. players
London Lions (basketball) players
McDonald's High School All-Americans
Memphis Grizzlies players
Memphis Hustle players
Oklahoma City Blue players
Parade High School All-Americans (boys' basketball)
Point guards